A total solar eclipse occurred on May 9, 1929. A solar eclipse occurs when the Moon passes between Earth and the Sun, thereby totally or partly obscuring the image of the Sun for a viewer on Earth. A total solar eclipse occurs when the Moon's apparent diameter is larger than the Sun's, blocking all direct sunlight, turning day into darkness. Totality occurs in a narrow path across Earth's surface, with the partial solar eclipse visible over a surrounding region thousands of kilometres wide. Totality was visible from Dutch East Indies (today's Indonesia), Federated Malay States (now belonging to Malaysia), Siam (name changed to Thailand later), French Indochina (the part now belonging to Vietnam), Spratly Islands, Philippines, and South Seas Mandate in Japan (the part now belonging to FS Micronesia).

Related eclipses

Solar eclipses 1928–1931

Saros 127

Metonic series

References

External links

 Photo of Solar Corona May 9, 1929

1929 05 09
1929 in science
1929 05 09
May 1929 events